HMS Achates was an  destroyer built for the Royal Navy during the late 1920s. Completed in 1930, she initially served with the Mediterranean Fleet. She was sunk on 31 December 1942 during the Battle of the Barents Sea.

Design and description 
The A-class destroyers were based on Amazon, slightly enlarged and carrying two more torpedo tubes. Acasta was powered by a pair of Brown-Curtis geared steam turbines, each driving one shaft, using steam provided by three Admiralty 3-drum boilers. The complement of the A-class ships was 134 officers and ratings and increased to 143 by 1940.

Their main armament consisted of four QF 4.7-inch (120 mm) Mk IX guns in single mounts, in two superfiring pairs in front of the bridge and aft of the superstructure. For anti-aircraft (AA) defence, they had two  QF 2-pounder Mk II AA guns mounted on a platform between their funnels. The ships were fitted with two above-water quadruple mounts for  torpedoes. Carrying the minesweeping paravanes on the quarterdeck limited depth charge chutes to three with two depth charges provided for each chute. The A-class destroyers were given space for an ASDIC system, but it was not initially fitted.

Ship history

Battle of the Denmark Strait

In early May 1941, the British Admiralty was on the alert that the German battleship  might attempt to break out into the North Atlantic, so Achates was ordered to Scapa Flow for possible deployment against the Germans. The intention was that the force would refuel in Hvalfjord, Iceland, and then sail again to watch the Denmark Strait.

On the evening of 23 May, weather started getting bad.  At 2055 hrs., Admiral Lancelot Holland aboard Hood signaled the destroyers "If you are unable to maintain this speed I will have to go on without you.  You should follow at your best speed."  At 0215 on the morning of 24 May, the destroyers were ordered to spread out at  intervals to search to the north.  At about 0535, the German forces were sighted by Hood, and shortly after, the Germans sighted the British ships. Firing commenced at 0552.  At 0601, Hood suffered a massive explosion, sinking the ship within two minutes.

Upon hearing that Hood had sunk, Electra raced to the area, arriving about two hours after Hood went under. They were expecting to find many survivors, and rigged scrambling nets and heaving lines, and placed life belts on the deck where they could be quickly thrown in. From the 94 officers and 1,321 ratings who were aboard Hood, only three survivors were found. Electra rescued these survivors, and continued searching. Shortly thereafter, Icarus and Anthony joined in and the three ships searched the area for more survivors. No more were found, only driftwood, debris, and a desk drawer filled with documents. After several hours searching, they left the area.

Kirkenes and Torch
In July 1941, while taking position in the screen of carriers preparing for the air strike against Kirkenes/Petsamo, Achates was mined and severely damaged, but managed to make port for repairs.

On 8 November 1942, while deployed off Oran, Algeria for operation "Torch", Achates detected, and attacked the Vichy French submarine , which had sortied to contest the Allied landings in the area. Achates attack on Argonaute, saw the rise of oil to the surface of the sea and huge air bubbles, as well as debris from both inside, and outside the submarine.  Following this, at a later point, HMS Westcott made a further attack, hence both ships were credited with her demise.

Battle of the Barents Sea
On 31 December 1942, Achates was on escort duty protecting the convoy JW 51B en route from Loch Ewe to Murmansk when she was sunk in the Barents Sea.

The German heavy cruiser , pocket battleship Lützow and six large destroyers had been ordered to attack and destroy the convoy. Despite being heavily outgunned the escort, under the command of Captain R. St. Vincent Sherbrooke, VC, beat off the attack and not one merchant vessel was lost.

At 11:15, Achates was laying smoke to protect the convoy when she was hit by gunfire from  Admiral Hipper, killing the commanding officer, Lt Cdr Johns, and forty crew.  The First Lieutenant, Lt L. E. Peyton-Jones, took over command and, despite having sustained severe damage in the shelling, Achates continued her smoke screen operation. At 13:30 she went down  ESE of Bear Island. 113 seamen were lost and 81 were rescued, one of whom later died on the trawler Northern Gem which had come to the aid of Achates. In response, the light cruiser  damaged Admiral Hipper, and subsequently sank her escort, .

References

Bibliography

External links
 Coxswain in the Northern Convoys by S.A. Kerslake; an ex-fisherman's account of convoy JW51B and the sinking of the Achates
 Royal Navy and Maritime Book Reviews: HMS Achates by Rob Jerrard
  The Last Commission of HMS Achates by H.J.Scott-Douglas; on the BBC "WW2 People's War" Archive
 Obituary: Commander Loftus Peyton-Jones, Daily Telegraph 9 January 2001
 HMS Achates (Clydebuilt Ships Database)

 

A- and B-class destroyers
1929 ships
World War II destroyers of the United Kingdom
Shipwrecks in the Barents Sea
World War II shipwrecks in the Arctic Ocean
Maritime incidents in December 1942
Ships built on the River Clyde